is a Japanese singer and songwriter signed to Universal Sigma. She is a former member of the girl group NMB48, where she served as captain of both the whole group as well as Team N, and a former concurrent member of AKB48's Team K. She made her debut as a solo artist in October 2016 with her first studio album "Rainbow" while she was still in NMB48, and her releases regularly place in the top ten of the Oricon weekly charts.

Career

Pre-2010: Early life and initial debut 
The youngest of four and influenced by her family's love for music, Sayaka Yamamoto started taking dance and singing classes in 2nd grade. In 5th grade, inspired by Avril Lavigne, she started learning guitar. Yamamoto initially debuted in the band MAD CATZ in 2008 as their lead guitarist. The bassist of the band left in 2009, and the band disbanded altogether by the end of the year.

2010–2012: Debut with NMB48 
In September 2010, Sayaka Yamamoto passed auditions for the first generation of NMB48 and was selected to debut in the group along with 25 other girls. They were announced as a group on October 9, 2010, and officially began performing at the NMB48 Theater on January 1, 2011. Yamamoto was also officially announced as captain of NMB48 on this day.

On March 10, 2011, Yamamoto was selected as one of 16 members who would form Team N, of which she was selected to serve as captain alongside her captaincy of the entire group. Team N made their debut at the NMB48 Theater on March 21. In May, Yamamoto and fellow Team N member Miyuki Watanabe were the first NMB48 members to be selected for an A-side senbatsu with the release of AKB48's 21st single "Everyday, Katyusha." Also in May, NMB48 revealed their first original song "Seishun no Lap Time" during a theater performance. It was centered by Yamamoto, and was released later as a B-side on the group's first single. On June 9, Yamamoto was the only member of NMB48 to rank in AKB48's 3rd general election. She placed 28th with 8,697 votes and as a result, sang on the B-side "Dakishimecha Ikenai" on AKB48's 22nd single "Flying Get." On July 20, NMB48 made their major CD debut with their first single "Zetsumetsu Kurokami Shoujo," for which Yamamoto was selected as a senbatsu member. She would go on to be a senbatsu member in all 19 NMB48 A-sides released during her time in the group, and the center for 13 of those singles. On October 19, NMB48 released their second single titled "Oh My God!", for which Yamamoto served as center with fellow Team N member Nana Yamada. This marked the first time Yamamoto was chosen as a center for a NMB48 A-side track. On October 26, Yamamoto participated in her second A-side senbatsu with AKB48 on their 23rd single "Kaze wa Fuiteiru."

Yamamoto was given her first solo A-side center on NMB48's third single "Junjou U-19," which was released on February 8, 2012. This was also the first NMB48 single to include a solo song, "Jungle Gym," sung by Yamamoto. On March 15, Yamamoto was a part of the senbatsu for AKB48's 25th single "GIVE ME FIVE!". On May 9, NMB48 released their fourth single "Nagiichi," centered by Yamamoto and Miyuki Watanabe. On May 23, Yamamoto was included as a part of the media senbatsu for AKB48's 26th single "Manatsu no Sounds Good!". On June 6, Yamamoto ranked 18th in AKB48's 4th general election with a total of 23,020 votes and as a result, sang on B-side "Nante Bohemian" as a member of "Undergirls" on AKB48's 27th single "Gingham Check." On August 8, NMB48 released their fifth single "Virginity," featuring Yamamoto as the sole center. On October 31, Yamamoto participated as a senbatsu member on AKB48's 28th single "UZA." On November 7, NMB48 released their 6th single "Kitagawa Kenji," for which Yamamoto served as center with Miyuki Watanabe. On November 21, Yamamoto released her first photobook entitled "Sayagami," which sold over 55,000 units. The photobook was released on the same day as Miyuki Watanabe's photobook and was marketed as a battle between the two members, which was ultimately "won" by Watanabe. On December 5, AKB48 released their 29th single "Eien Pressure," for which Yamamoto sang on the B-side "HA!" as NMB48 and served as center along with Miyuki Watanabe. This marked the first time Yamamoto served as a center for a B-side on an AKB48 single.

2013–2015: Rise in popularity and concurrency with AKB48 
Yamamoto participated as a senbatsu member in AKB48's 30th single "So long!" and 31st single "Sayonara Crawl," released on February 20 and May 22, 2013, respectively. On June 8, Yamamoto ranked 14th in AKB48's 5th general election with 51,793 votes. The release of AKB48's 32nd single "Koisuru Fortune Cookie" on August 21 marked the first time Yamamoto entered an AKB48 senbatsu through the election. On June 19, NMB48 released their 7th single "Bokura no Eureka," and on October 2, their 8th single ""Kamonegix." Yamamoto was the sole center for both singles. On October 30, Yamamoto participated in AKB48's 33rd single "Heart Ereki" as a senbatsu member.

On February 24, 2014, it was announced that Yamamoto would hold a concurrent position in AKB48's Team K, coming into effect in May. On February 26, Yamamoto participated in AKB48's 35th single "Mae Shika Mukanee" as a senbatsu member. Over the next four years, she would continue participating in AKB48 A-sides as a senbatsu member for the rest of her tenure as an idol, through their 52nd single "Teacher Teacher." On March 26, NMB48 released their 8th single "Takane no Ringo," for which Yamamoto again served as a solo center. On May 21, Yamamoto participated as a media senbatsu member on AKB48's 36th single "Labrador Retriever" and also served as the center for B-side "Itoshiki Rival" with Jurina Matsui as a member of Team K. This marked Yamamoto's first participation in an AKB48 single as a concurrent AKB48 member. On June 7, Yamamoto ranked 6th in AKB48's 6th general election with 67,916 votes, marking her first entry into the "Kami 7". As a result, Yamamoto participated as a senbatsu member on AKB48's 37th single "Kokoro no Placard." Yamamoto was also the only NMB48 member to rank in senbatsu that year.

On July 4, a JT-sponsored commercial of Sayaka Yamamoto singing "Hitoiki Tsukinagara" a cappella began airing. Several different arrangements of the song featuring Yamamoto have been made since for subsequent commercials, and it was also later recorded on her first solo album in 2016. In 2014, she also began collaborating with other artists as both a guitarist and a singer on music programs like "FNS Music Festival" and "UTAGE!". In October, her radio program "NMB48 Yamamoto Sayaka no Regular Toretemouta!" started airing. On November 5, NMB48 released their 9th single entitled "Rashikunai," for which Yamamoto participated in as a senbatsu member. This was the first single since "Oh My God!" to not be centered by Yamamoto.

On February 10, 2015, Yamamoto released her second photobook titled "SY," which sold 42,779 in its first week of sales according to Oricon and topped the Oricon sales charts. The high sales volume prompted a second printing of the gravure photobook. On June 6, Yamamoto ranked 6th in AKB48's 7th general election with 97,866 votes, and participated as a senbatsu member on AKB48's 41st single "Halloween Night," as a result.

On August 18, it was announced that Sayaka Yamamoto would be the center of AKB48's "365nichi no Kamihikouki," which was the theme song for the NHK drama “Asa ga Kita” and was later released as a B-side on AKB48's 42nd single "Kuchibiru ni Be My Baby." This marked the first time she served as a solo center on a full-senbatsu AKB48 track, not including those recorded as NMB48. On October 7, NMB48 released their 13th single "Must be now," with Yamamoto returning as center for a NMB48 A-side.

2016–2017: Solo debut 
On January 8, 2016, Yamamoto released her third photobook "Minna no Yamamoto Sayaka." On April 18, she began co-hosting the radio show “Appare Yattemasu” on Mondays, a position she would hold for four years. On April 27, NMB48 released their 14th single "Amagami Hime," centered by Yamamoto. This single also included a solo version of the aforementioned "365nichi no Kamihikouki" by Yamamoto. On May 26, she graduated from her concurrent position in AKB48's Team K and returned as a full-time member of NMB48. On June 18, Yamamoto ranked 4th, her highest rank, in AKB48's 8th general election with 110,411 votes, and participated as a senbatsu member on AKB48's 45th's single “LOVE TRIP / Shiawase wo Wakenasai" as a result. Prior to the election, she stated that 2016 would be the last year she participated in the event. On August 3, NMB48 released their 15th single "Boku wa Inai," which included a B-side track Yamamoto composed, "Ima Naraba."

On August 24, Sayaka Yamamoto announced she would be releasing her first solo album. It would be produced by Seiji Kameda and include tracks written and composed by her. On October 26, she released her album "Rainbow" and it debuted at 3rd place on the weekly Oricon albums chart. She also embarked on her first solo tour, eponymously named "Rainbow," with five performances in four venues. On December 28, NMB48 released their 16th single "Boku Igai no Dareka," featuring Yamamoto as center. It also included another B-side composed by her, "Kodoku Guitar." On December 31, she ranked 1st place at AKB48's special election during the 67th NHK Kouhaku Uta Gassen with 41,990 votes.

On March 29, 2017, Yamamoto released her essay book, "Subete no Riyuu." She also announced the same month she would not participate in the upcoming 9th AKB48 general election, reiterating her statement from last year. In May, she was one of two artists to record and have their version of the Hanshin Tigers' song "Rokko Oroshi" air at the team's home stadium before matches as well as after winning games. On July 7, she was one of the featured artists on "The best covers of DREAMS COME TRUE DoriUta Vol. 1" with her cover of "Nando Demo," which was also later re-released as a B-side on her second solo album. The following day on July 8, she also appeared in her first music festival as a solo artist at DoriUta Fes, hosted by DREAMS COME TRUE.

On October 4, Sayaka Yamamoto released her second solo album "identity," which debuted at 2nd place on the weekly Oricon album charts. It was again produced by Seiji Kameda and seven of the tracks included were written and composed by her. She also held her second tour with 8 performances in 7 venues.

2018–present: Graduation from NMB48 and continued solo success 
On April 4, 2018, NMB48 released their 18th single "Yokubomono," for which Yamamoto served as center. In May, Yamamoto appeared in her first official rock festival, METROCK. On July 30, Sayaka Yamamoto announced during NMB48 LIVE TOUR 2018 in Summer that she would be graduating from NMB48. On October 17, NMB48 released their 19th single "Boku Datte Naichau yo," Yamamoto's final single with the group. In addition to her graduation solo song and the two tracks centered by her, the single also includes another B-side she composed, "Yume wa Nigenai." On October 27, 2018, her graduation concert titled "SAYAKA SONIC~Sayaka, Sasayaka, Sayonara, Sayaka~" was held at Expo '70 Commemorative Park, marking NMB48's first outdoor concert and their largest concert to date. She officially graduated from NMB48 on November 4, 2018, with graduation performances on November 3 and 4 at the NMB48 Theater.

On January 1, 2019, Sayaka Yamamoto announced her third tour “I’m ready,” consisting of 27 performances in 24 venues, and the opening of her fan clubs SYC and SYC Mobile on January 7. On February 17, she announced her transfer to Universal Music Japan as her record company, with Universal Sigma as her label. In 2019, she appeared in more rock festivals, including METROCK, ROCK IN JAPAN, and MONSTER BaSH.

On April 17, Sayaka Yamamoto released her first solo single "Ichirinsou." In August, her radio show "Yamamoto Sayaka Kakeru" began airing. On September 4, Yamamoto released her second single "Toge." On September 17, Yamamoto announced via her YouTube channel that her third single "Tsuioku no Hikari" would be released on November 20, with her third album α (Alpha) following on December 25.

In February 2020, she embarked on her fourth tour and held 3 performances before ultimately canceling the rest of the tour due to the COVID-19 pandemic. She held a final no-audience performance via livestream on August 28. On September 17, Yamamoto pre-released “Ai Nante Iranai,” which served as a CM song for a MOS Burger commercial, in which she also starred. On October 28, Yamamoto released her fourth solo single "Zero Universe," the ending song for TV Tokyo's "Anoko no Yume wo Mitan desu." Also in October, she started hosting the radio show "SPARK" on Mondays. In December, her song "Boku wa Omocha" for NHK's Minna no Uta began airing on the program.

On February 24, 2021, Sayaka Yamamoto released her fifth single "Dramatic ni Kanpai," which was the theme song for Tokai TV/Fuji TV's "Sono Onna, Jiruba." In May, her radio show "HEART STUDIO" began airing. On July 14, Sayaka Yamamoto released her first digital single "yonder," which was the CM song for Yamagata Nissan Group's 60th Anniversary commercial. On August 25, Yamamoto surprise released her second digital single "Don't hold me back." In September, she embarked on her fifth tour, titled "re," with 12 performances scheduled in 11 venues. On October 27, Yamamoto released her third digital single "Aimatte," which was first revealed during her tour. On November 26, it was announced she would be going on hiatus, retroactively since November 19, due to issues with her thyroid and underwent treatment. On December 1, she was a featured artist on Night Tempo's "I Don't Wanna" from his major debut album “Ladies in the City.”

On April 1, 2022, Sayaka Yamamoto was announced as one of the singers featured on the soundtrack for the 2022 RPG “Memento Mori." A full version of her song “Lament” was released on the RPG’s associated YouTube channel on April 18.

On July 14, Yamamoto announced her return from hiatus, with her condition in remission. On August 15, she held a special livestreamed performance to mark her return, and on October 16, she performed at the music festival Chillin' Vibes, her first in-person live event since ending her hiatus.

On November 11, the digital album "ELLEGARDEN TRIBUTE" was released, with Yamamoto as one of the featuring artists with her rendition of "Kaze no Hi." She wrapped up 2022 with solo concerts in Tokyo and Osaka on December 27 and 29 respectively.

On February 13, 2023, Yamamoto announced the establishment of her own private office, SYCompany, following the end of her management contract with her previous agency Showtitle at the end of 2022. Also in February, she held a fan club-exclusive Billboard Live tour, and participated in tribute concerts for Miyuki Nakajima. 

Yamamoto will be releasing her fourth studio album “&” on May 17 and will be embarking on another nationwide tour in June and July 2023.

Musical style and influences 
Since going solo, Sayaka Yamamoto composes and writes all her releases. The majority of her first two albums, released whilst she was still active in NMB48, consist of self-compositions as well. In addition to her own music, she also has composed for her former group, and provided background vocals for songs she participated in while in NMB48 and AKB48. While her roots are in rock music, Yamamoto's own work encompasses a wide spectrum and is not limited to a specific genre nor defined by a particular label, as noted by columnists. In her own words, she wants her music “to go beyond genres…so [she doesn’t] think about making a particular type of music” and creates what she wants to at the time. Yamamoto often credits Takeshi Hosomi, Avril Lavigne, and yui as her biggest musical inspirations and people she admires, among others. Yamamoto also frequently collaborates with Takahiro Konagawa, who serves as bandleader of her backing band Team SY in addition to producing and arranging many of her songs. Other main collaborators and backing band members include Koji Kusakari, Shota Okuno, SATOKO, asami, and Ayasa. As a guitarist, Yamamoto currently uses a Gibson Custom True Historic '59 Les Paul and a Les Paul Traditional 2015 Japan Limited as her main electric guitars, and a Martin D-28 and a Martin D-15 Streetmaster as her main acoustic guitars.

Discography

Albums

Singles

As lead artist

Digital singles 
 "yonder" (2021)
 "Don't hold me back" (2021)
 "Aimatte." (あいまって。) (2021)

As featured artist 

 "Nando Demo," Various Artists (2017, The best covers of DREAMS COME TRUE DoriUta Vol. 1)
 "Ayamachi," Junichi Inagaki (2017,  HARVEST)
"I Don't Wanna," Night Tempo (2021, Ladies in the City)
"Kaze no Hi," Various Artists (2022, ELLEGARDEN TRIBUTE)

Singles with NMB48

Albums with NMB48
 Teppen Tottande!
 "Teppen Tottande!" (Center)
 "12/31" (Center)
 "Lily" / Team N (Center)
 "Dazai Osamu wo Yonda Ka?" (Center)

 Sekai no Chuushin wa Osaka ya ~Namba Jichiku~
 "Ibiza Girl" (Center)
 ""Seito Techo no Shashin wa Ki ni Haittenai" no Hoshoku" (Center)
 "Densha wo Oriru" / Team N (Center)
 "Dakishimetai Kedo" / Solo
Namba Ai ~Ima Omou Koto~

 "Masaka Singapore"
 "Namba Ai"

Singles with AKB48

Albums with AKB48
 Koko ni Ita Koto
 "Koko ni Ita Koto"

 1830m
 "Aozora yo Sabishikunai Ka?"

 Tsugi no Ashiato
 "10 Krone to Pan" (Center)

 Koko ga Rhodes da, Koko de Tobe!
 "Ai no Sonzai"
 "Conveyor" / Team K
 "Ai to Kanashimi no Jisa" / Solo

 0 to 1 no Aida
 "Ai no Shisha" / Team K
 "LOVE ASH" / Duet with Minami Takahashi

 Thumbnail
 "Ayamachi" / Duet with Junichi Inagaki

 Bokutachi wa, Ano Hi no Yoake wo Shitteiru
 "Kutsuhimo no Musubikata"
 "Kusaimono Darake" (Center)

Stage Units with NMB48 and AKB48 
NMB48 Team N 1st Stage 
 "Bird"
 

NMB48 Team N 2nd Stage 
 "Blue rose"
 

NMB48 Team N 3rd Stage 
  / Solo
 
 

NMB48 Team N 3rd Stage Revival 
  / Solo
 
 

AKB48 Team K 6th Stage Revival "RESET"
 

AKB48 Team K 4th Stage Revival 
 
NMB48 Team N 4th Stage "Mokugekisha" (目撃者)

Live Performances

Concert tours 

 Yamamoto Sayaka LIVE TOUR 2016 ~Rainbow~
 Yamamoto Sayaka LIVE TOUR 2017 ~identity~
 Yamamoto Sayaka LIVE TOUR 2019 ~I'm ready~
 Yamamoto Sayaka LIVE TOUR 2020 ~α~
 SAYAKA YAMAMOTO LIVE TOUR 2021 ~re~
 SAYAKA YAMAMOTO LIVE TOUR 2023 -&-

Other concerts 

 AbemaTV 1st ANNIVERSARY LIVE (2017)
 MTV LIVE PREMIUM: SAYAKA YAMAMOTO (2019)
 SAYAKA YAMAMOTO LIVE 2022 "now" (2 performances)
 Nakajima Miyuki RESPECT LIVE 2023 Utaenishi (2 performances)

Fan club-exclusive concerts 

 Sayaka Yamamoto Celebration 2019
 Congregation 2019
 Sayaka Yamamoto Celebration 2020 (livestream only)
 CUE 2021
 Sayaka Yamamoto Celebration 2021 in Tokyo and Osaka
 Sayaka Yamamoto Cure 2023 -Billboard Live Tour-

Filmography

Radio
 NMB48 Gakuen (April 9, 2011 – September 28, 2013, ABC Radio)
NMB48 Yamamoto Sayaka no Regular Toretemouta! (October 2, 2014 – March 27, 2016, Nippon Cultural Broadcasting)
Appare Yattemasu!, Monday (April 18, 2016 – April 6, 2020, MBS Radio)
Yamamoto Sayaka Kakeru (August 10, 2019 – March 27, 2021, CROSS FM)
SPARK (October 6, 2020 – December 27, 2021, J-WAVE)
HEART STUDIO (May 2, 2021 – December 26, 2021, FM802)

Television

Variety shows 

 Wakeari! Red Zone (October 4, 2013  – 2017, Yomiuri TV)
 NMB48 Yamamoto Sayaka's M-Nee ~Music Onee-San~ (November 30, 2013 – 2015, Space Shower TV Plus)
 Viking (April 4, 2014 – March 31, 2017, Fuji TV)
 UTAGE! (May 19, 2014 – August 22, 2019, TBS)
 Chichin Puipui (June 7, 2018 – February 14, 2019, MBS TV)
 Toraban (March 2016 – 2018, Asahi Broadcasting)
 Mint! (April 2019 – March 2020, MBS TV)

Dramas 
 Majisuka Gakuen 4 (2015, Nippon TV) as Antonio
 Majisuka Gakuen 5 (2015, Nippon TV) as Antonio
 AKB Horror Night: Adrenaline's Night Ep.3 - Product Storage (2015, TV Asahi) as Anna
 Rekishi Hiwa Historia Ep. 250 - An Inner Palace Tale of Love and Sadness (2016, NHK) as Hiroko Konoe
 AKB Love Night: Love Factory Ep.11 - Love Letters of the Past (2016, TV Asahi) as Mizuki Kyōno
 Hibana (2016, Netflix)
 Cabasuka Gakuen (2016, Nippon TV) as Antonio
 Ueki Hitoshi to Nobosemon Ep. 5 (2017, NHK) as Mari Sono

Film
 NMB48 Geinin! The Movie Owarai Seishun Girls! (2013)
 NMB48 Geinin! The Movie Returns Sotsugyō! Owarai Seishun Girls!! Aratanaru Tabidachi (2014)

Documentary 

 To Everest for the 5th Time ~Kuriki Nobukazu's Challenge From Rock Bottom~ (2016, NHK), Narrator
 Ikimonogakari Yoshiki Mizuno's Dialogue on Aku Yū (2017, NHK BS Premium)
 Yamamoto Sayaka Graduation Special ~8 Years with NMB48~ (2018, BS SKY PerfecTV!)
 ZARD Forever: How Sakai Izumi's Songs Came to Life (2019, NHK BS Premium), Narrator
 Yamamoto Sayaka Time Triangle (2019, Fuji TV TWO)

Bibliography

Magazines
 Smart, Takarajimasha 1995-, (October 2012 – present)
 Tarzan, MAGAZINE HOUSE 1986-, (August 20, 2015 – July 6, 2017)
 Skream!, GEKI-ROCK ENTERTAINMENT, (September 2018 – November 2019)

Essay Books 

 Subete no Riyuu (March 29, 2017, Gentosha) ISBN 9784344030879

Photobooks
 Saya Gami (November 21, 2012, Shueisha) 
 SY (February 10, 2015, Yoshimoto Books) 
 Minna no Yamamoto Sayaka (January 8, 2016, Yoshimoto Books)

AKB48 general elections
 In 2011, Yamamoto placed 28th with 8,697 votes.
 In 2012, she placed 18th with 23,020 votes.
 In 2013, she placed 14th with 51,793 votes.
 In 2014, she placed 6th with 67,916 votes.
 In 2015, she placed 6th with 97,866 votes.
 In 2016, she placed 4th with 110,411 votes.

References

External links

  
 
 
 
 
 
 

1993 births
Living people
21st-century Japanese women singers
Japanese women singer-songwriters
Japanese women pop singers
Japanese women rock singers
21st-century Japanese singers
Japanese singer-songwriters
Japanese guitarists
Universal Music Japan artists
Japanese idols
NMB48 members
AKB48 members
People from Ibaraki, Osaka
Musicians from Osaka Prefecture